Rubén Alcaraz Jiménez (born 1 May 1991) is a Spanish professional footballer who plays as a central midfielder for Cádiz CF.

Club career
Born in Barcelona, Catalonia, Alcaraz graduated with CF Damm's youth setup, after a stint at FC Barcelona and RCD Espanyol. He made his senior debuts with UA Horta in 2010, representing the side in the regional leagues.

In the 2010 summer, Alcaraz joined UDA Gramenet, being assigned to the reserves also in the lower levels. After making his debuts in Segunda División B and eventually suffering relegation, he was definitely promoted to the main squad in June 2011.

On 28 June 2012, Alcaraz signed for AE Prat in the third level. On 11 July 2014, he moved to fellow league team CE L'Hospitalet, and scored ten goals in 34 appearances during his first and only season at the club.

On 17 June 2015, Alcaraz signed a two-year deal with Segunda División side Girona FC. He made his professional debut on 24 August, starting in a 1–0 away win against Bilbao Athletic.

Alcaraz scored his first goal in the second tier on 1 November 2015, netting the game's only in an away success over CA Osasuna. On 21 August of the following year, he scored a brace in a 3–3 draw at Sevilla Atlético.

On 11 July 2017, after achieving promotion to La Liga, Alcaraz renewed his contract until 2020 and was immediately loaned to UD Almería for one year. He was the club's top goalscorer with nine goals, playing a key part as the club narrowly avoided relegation.

On 3 August 2018, Alcaraz signed a four-year contract with Real Valladolid, newly-promoted to the main category. He made his debut in the main category of Spanish football on 17 August, starting in a 0–0 away draw against  former side Girona.

Alcaraz scored his first goal in the top tier on 7 October 2018, netting the game's only in a 1–0 home success over SD Huesca. He quickly established himself as a regular starter, but suffered team relegation in 2021.

On 20 January 2022, Alcaraz was loaned to Cádiz CF in the first division, until June. On 1 June, the club exercised his buyout clause, and he signed a permanent two-year contract.

References

External links

1991 births
Living people
Footballers from Barcelona
Spanish footballers
Association football midfielders
La Liga players
Segunda División players
Segunda División B players
Tercera División players
CF Damm players
UA Horta players
UDA Gramenet footballers
AE Prat players
CE L'Hospitalet players
Girona FC players
UD Almería players
Real Valladolid players
Cádiz CF players
Catalonia international footballers